Jackson Township is one of nine townships in Hancock County, Indiana, United States. As of the 2010 census, its population was 1,786 and it contained 696 housing units.

History
Jackson Township was organized in 1831 during the May term. The board of commissioners of Hancock county was formed to include what is now Jackson and Brown townships. It was named for President Andrew Jackson.

Geography
Lakes in this township include Perry Lake. The streams of Anthony Creek, Morris Creek and Willow Branch run through this township.

Unincorporated towns
 Charlottesville
 Cleveland
 Pleasant Hill
(This list is based on USGS data and may include former settlements.)

Adjacent townships
 Brown Township (north)
 Wayne Township, Henry County (east)
 Ripley Township, Rush County (southeast)
 Blue River Township (south)
 Center Township (west)
 Green Township (northwest)

Cemeteries
The township contains two cemeteries: Simmons and Sixmile.

Major highways
  Interstate 70
  U.S. Route 40

References
 
 United States Census Bureau cartographic boundary files

External links
 Indiana Township Association
 United Township Association of Indiana

Townships in Hancock County, Indiana
Townships in Indiana